Chen Biao (born 9 February 1971) is a Chinese fencer. He competed in the team foil event at the 1992 Summer Olympics.

References

External links
 

1971 births
Living people
Chinese male foil fencers
Olympic fencers of China
Fencers at the 1992 Summer Olympics